Lowlet (also known as Lolet and Lūt) is a village in Tangeh Soleyman Rural District, Kolijan Rostaq District, Sari County, Mazandaran Province, Iran. At the 2006 census, its population was 77, in 27 families.

References 

Populated places in Sari County